Daniel Borzutzky is a Chicago-based poet and translator. His collection The Performance of Becoming Human won the 2016 National Book Award. The son of Chilean immigrants, Borzutzky's work often addresses immigration, worker exploitation, political corruption, and economic disparity.

He received a BA from the University of Pittsburgh in 1997 and an MFA from the School of the Art Institute of Chicago in 2000.

Borzutzky has received fellowships from the Illinois Arts Council and the National Endowment for the Arts. He is an Associate Professor of English and Latino Studies at the University of Illinois at Chicago.

His 2018 collection Lake Michigan was a finalist for the Griffin International Poetry Prize. In 2021 he published Written After a Massacre in the Year 2018, which was reviewed in The New Yorker and was a finalist for the Chicago Review of Books Poetry Award. His other books include In the Murmurs of the Rotten Carcass Economy; Memories of my Overdevelopment; and The Book of Interfering Bodies. 

Alongside his writing, Borzutzky is also known for his work as a translator. He received the 2017 American Literary Translators Association National Translation Award for his translation of ’s Valdivia (Co-im-press, 2016) and a PEN/Heim Translation Fund Grant for his translation of The Country of Planks (Action Books, 2015) by the Chilean poet Raúl Zurita.

Works

Poetry 
Full-length collections
 
 Lake Michigan, University of Pittsburgh Press. 2018. , 
 The Performance of Becoming Human Brooklyn, N.Y.: Brooklyn Arts Press. 2016. , 
 In the Murmurs of the Rotten Carcass Economy Brooklyn, N.Y.: Nightboat Books. 2015. , 
 The Book of Interfering Bodies Brooklyn, N.Y.: Nightboat Books. 2011. , 
 The Ecstasy of Capitulation Buffalo, N.Y.: Blaze Vox Books. 2007. , 

Chapbooks 
 Bedtime Stories for the End of the World Bloof Books, 2014. 
 Data Bodies (Holon, 2013)
 Failure in the imagination, Milwaukee, WI: Bronze Skull Press, 2007. 

Poetry/essay 
 Memories of my Overdevelopment, Chicago: Kenning Editions, 2015. 
 Arbitrary tales, Triple Press: 2005. ,

Translations 
 Galo Ghigliotto, Valdivia (co•im•press, 2016)
 Raúl Zurita, The Country of Planks (Action Books, 2015) 
 Raúl Zurita, Song for his Disappeared Love (Action Books, 2010)
 , Port Trakl (Action Books, 2008)

Honors 
 National Book Award, The Performance of Becoming Human (2016)
 American Literary Translators Association National Translation Award for Poetry (2017)
 PEN/Heim Translation Fund Grant, Raúl Zurita's El País de Tablas (The Country of Planks) (2013)
 National Endowment for the Arts Grant (2013)
 Griffin Poetry Prize shortlist, Lake Michigan (2019)

References

External links 
 Profile at the National Book Foundation website
 Profile at Poetry Foundation website

Living people
American male poets
Poets from Illinois
Poets from Pennsylvania
National Book Award winners
21st-century American poets
21st-century American translators
American people of Chilean descent
Wilbur Wright College faculty
University of Illinois Chicago faculty
21st-century American male writers
1974 births